The 2008 Louisiana–Lafayette Ragin' Cajuns softball team represented the University of Louisiana at Lafayette in the 2008 NCAA Division I softball season. The Ragin' Cajuns played their home games at Lamson Park and were led by eighth and ninth year husband and wife head coaching duo Michael and Stefni Lotief, respectively.

Roster

Coaching staff

Schedule and results

Baton Rouge Regional

Houston Super Regional

Women's College World Series

References

Louisiana Ragin' Cajuns softball seasons
Louisiana softball
Louisiana-Lafayette
Women's College World Series seasons